Solomon Areda Waktolla is an Ethiopian lawyer who had served the Deputy Chief Justice/Vice President of the Federal Supreme Court of Ethiopia from 2018 to 2023. Solomon is a prominent Ethiopian lawyer with 23 years of experience in the practice of law, public administration and policy research who is committed for seeing a free and independent judiciary in Ethiopia. Solomon served in the Ethiopian Judiciary mainly as a judge for 18 years on different levels of the court in both regional and federal positions. In addition, he has been appointed to the membership of the Permanent Court of Arbitration (PCA) at The Hague, Netherlands for a six-year term to serve as an Arbitrator.

Early life and education 

Solomon Areda Waktolla  was born in the town of Garba Guracha, Salalee, North Shewa zone of Oromia regional state in Ethiopia.

He attended his elementary and high school education in a public school in the town of Garba Guracha. He then attended Addis Ababa University and obtained a bachelor's degree in Law in 1997. He received a Masters of Laws degree (LL.M) from Harvard Law School and Master of public Administration (MPA) from Harvard Kennedy School of Government. He obtained HIID Merit Scholarship award from Harvard University. At Harvard Kennedy School of Government, Solomon completed the fellowship of Edward S. Mason Program in public Policy and Management. In addition, he received Masters of Laws (LL.M) in International Economic Law at the University of Amsterdam.

He is a member of the Harvard Alumni Association and currently serving as Harvard University Contact Person in Ethiopia. Solomon is a fellow of Golda Meir Mount Carmel International Training Center and an alumnus of the Center for American and International Law.

Judicial career 
After graduating from the law school, Solomon began working as an assistant judge in the Oromia Region Supreme Court. After his clerkship, Solomon was appointed as a judge of the Regional High Court in West Shewa Zone of Oromia region in Ambo Town. During his years in the Ambo High Court, he served in both Civil and Criminal divisions of the court. In 2001, Solomon started his judgeship at the Federal First Instance Court of Ethiopia. From February 2003 to January 2009, Solomon served as a Federal High Court Judge and sat in Commercial, Criminal and Labor Divisions of the Federal High Court.

During his six-years tenure at the Federal High Court, Justice Solomon presided over the historical Ethiopian Red Terror genocide trial where the former Ministers and other Higher Officials that served during the Derg regime were prosecuted for genocide and crimes against humanity.

In January 2009, the Ethiopian House of Parliament appointed Solomon to serve as the Vice President of the Federal First Instance Court of Ethiopia.

Private legal practice 

After graduating from Harvard law School, in December 2014 Solomon started the private legal practice, establishing his own firm named Solomon Areda Law Office in Addis Ababa. Solomon Areda Law office offered a diversified expertise on various areas of the law; ranging from dealing in complex litigation and arbitration, corporate and commercial transactions, banking and finance, labor and employment, intellectual property, energy and infrastructure, mining and natural resources, construction law and Tax law. He advised both local, as well as global multi-nationals seeking to do business in Ethiopia and other African Countries Solomon also represented local and international companies on multi-million commercial disputes before Federal Courts and Arbitration Tribunals.

Membership of the Permanent Court of Arbitration (PCA)
Deputy Chief Justice Solomon was appointed to the membership of the Permanent Court of Arbitration (PCA) for a term of six years as of December 2017 to serve as an arbitrator. The PCA was the first permanent intergovernmental organization to provide a forum for the resolution of international disputes through arbitration and other peaceful means. The PCA is established by the Convention for the Pacific Settlement of International Disputes, concluded at The Hague 1899 during the first Hague Peace Conference to facilitate arbitration and other forms of dispute resolution between states.

Policy research 
The Ethiopian Government in collaboration with UNDP hired an international consultant, Center for International Legal Cooperation CILC), to conduct a study in order to identify the shortcomings of the Ethiopian legal system. In this study, Solomon worked with the group of International Experts and produced a Comprehensive Justice Sector Reform Program Base Line Study Report. The Ethiopian legal reform was initiated based on this study.

Congressional Coalition on Adoption Institute the US based non-profit organization, organized The Way Forward Project to conduct a study analyzing opportunities and challenges facing policy makers in six African Countries including Ethiopia as they work to develop system of Care that serve children in and through their families. Justice Solomon, worked with a group of international Experts in framing the strategies for developing the legal and government infrastructure necessary to support child welfare systems which promote individualized best interest determinations and family-based care. The Way Forward Project was released at US State Department Summit held on 8 November 2011 at George C. Marshall Center in the presence of the former Secretary of State Hillary Rodham Clinton and other officials from the US and other parts of the world.

Solomon engaged in coordinating various projects with NGOs and Government offices geared towards promoting child justice through child friendly courts. He presented a research paper on 'the creation of child friendly courts in Ethiopia' on the UN Conference on the Convention of the Rights of the Child held in Geneva November 2009.

At Harvard Law School Solomon, as a required written work, authored legal policy research on Land governance regime of Ethiopia. Ethiopia is one of the African countries that attracted foreign investors in agricultural land investment. However, these land investments has led to widespread displacement of the local people and massive human right violations. The government leased these lands to foreign investors by displacing small scale land holders, pastoralists and other indigenous people, who depend on land for their survival. The research focuses on how to redesign the land governance system of Ethiopia by examining a wide range of other countries' collaborative arrangements between large-scale investors and local small-scale farmers and finally proposes what alternative inclusive business models and policy frame works to be adapted in the Ethiopia's context to address the current challenges.

Appointment to the position of Deputy Chief Justice
On 1 November 2018, Prime Minister Abiy Ahmed announced the nomination of Meaza Ashenafi and Solomon Areda to the Chief justice and Deputy Chief Justice position of the Federal Supreme Court of Ethiopia respectively in the Ethiopian Parliament. The House of People's Representatives (HPR) approved their appointment by unanimous vote. Some of the parliamentarians who spoke during the nomination have also praised the Prime Minister Abiy Ahmed for his picks based on meritocracy.
Deputy Chief Justice Solomon, serving alongside newly appointed Chief Justice Meaza Ashenafi, is engaged with reforming and modernizing  the Ethiopian Judiciary since coming into office. He is also presiding over one of the cassation benches of the Federal Supreme court. Furthermore, he is serving as a Deputy chair of the Council of the Constitutional Inquiry of Ethiopia. 

On 17 January 2023, Meaza Ashenafi and Solomon Areda resigned from their post. A letter of HoPR did not mention the reason behind their resignations.

References

Living people
Addis Ababa University alumni
Harvard Law School alumni
Harvard Kennedy School alumni
University of Amsterdam alumni
Oromo people
People from Oromia Region
Year of birth missing (living people)